Chinu XXX (born 6 June 1987) is a British freestyle wrestler.  Usually known as Chinu Singh, he competed for England in the men's freestyle 125 kg event at the 2014 Commonwealth Games where he won a bronze medal.

Commonwealth Games
Chinu beat Claude Mbianga from Cameroon in the wrestling 125kg men's freestyle "round of sixteen" (actually only four, since there were ten competitors in total, six getting byes) to progress to the quarter finals where he beat Zaman Anwar from Pakistan.  In the semifinals he lost to eventual gold medal winner Canadian Korey Jarvis.   He beat Hollis Mkanga from Kenya in the repechage  to win one of the two bronze medals for the event.

References

External links
 
 Chinu Xxx wins Commonwealth Games bronze; how the wrestler got his name

1987 births
Living people
English male wrestlers
Commonwealth Games bronze medallists for England
Wrestlers at the 2014 Commonwealth Games
English people of Indian descent
Sportspeople from Ludhiana
Commonwealth Games medallists in wrestling
British male sport wrestlers
European Games competitors for Great Britain
Wrestlers at the 2015 European Games
Medallists at the 2014 Commonwealth Games